Mike New (born February 12, 1968) is a former American basketball forward-center for the Milton Keynes Lions of the British Basketball League. Since 2007 New has also held the position of Head Coach of the Milton Keynes College Basketball Academy. He is now the head coach of the Milton Keynes Lions

References

External links
Milton Keynes Lions profile
Eurobasket profile

1968 births
Living people
American men's basketball coaches
American men's basketball players
London Lions (basketball) players
New Mexico State Aggies men's basketball players
Centers (basketball)
Forwards (basketball)